Hans Heinrich August Gábor, Baron Thyssen-Bornemisza de Kászon (13 April 1921 – 27 April 2002), an industrialist and art collector, was a Dutch-born Swiss citizen with a Hungarian title and heir to a German fortune, a long-time resident of Spain, and son of a German father and a Hungarian and English American mother (related to Daniel M. Frost and John Kerry). His fifth and last wife, Carmen "Tita" Cervera, is a former Miss Spain.

Early life
Thyssen-Bornemisza was born in Scheveningen, Netherlands, the son of Heinrich, Baron Thyssen-Bornemisza de Kászon de Impérfalva (1875–1947) and his first wife, Margit, Baroness Bornemisza de Kászon (1887–1971). The Thyssen family's fortune was built upon a steel and armaments empire: Heinrich Thyssen had abandoned Germany as a young man and settled in Hungary in 1905. In Budapest, Heinrich married the daughter of the king's Hungarian chamberlain Gábor Bornemisza de Kászon et Impérfalva (1859-1915) who, having no sons of his own, adopted Heinrich, the Emperor Franz Joseph I of Austria-Hungary extending his father-in-law's baronial title in the Hungarian nobility to Heinrich and his male-line descendants in 1907. Baroness Margit Bornemisza's grandparents were the Baron Albert Bornemisza de Kászon (1832-1899) and the Countess Gabriella Kornis de Gönczruszka (1834-1902).

Career
With his father's death, Thyssen-Bornemisza inherited  TBG (Thyssen-Bornemisza Group) Holdings N.V., a business empire that included oil, naval construction (Bremer Vulkan) and large parts of Rotterdam harbor, as well as a major art collection with hundreds of paintings of European masters from between the 14th and the 19th centuries.

Thyssen-Bornemisza was also an avid horse lover. From then on, his business was limited to art. He bought more old masters, from Duccio to Francisco Goya; and fifteen years after his father's death, he bought his first piece of modern art, a watercolor painting by Emil Nolde dated from between 1931 and 1935, starting the entry of 20th century's paintings in the collection (including Edgar Degas, Piet Mondrian, Pablo Picasso, and Fernand Léger). His preference however went to German Expressionism, and he soon became a real expert in painting.

Assets dispute
As part of an attempt to dissolve a trust, thereby acquiring control of her third husband's assets, Tita cast doubt on the paternity of Baron Georg Heinrich Thyssen-Bornemisza, alleging that his father was actually Count Iván Batthyány de Német-Ujvár (1910–1985), the husband of Thyssen's sister, Countess Margit Batthyány (1911-1989). However, a settlement was reached between the parties before the baron's death, which brought to a "peaceable" conclusion the wrangling over control of the vast Thyssen art collection, which is to remain in Spain, Hans Heinrich having been the founder of the Thyssen-Bornemisza Museum in Madrid. One of the paintings in the museum, Rue Saint-Honoré in the Afternoon, Effect of Rain by Camille Pissarro, belonged to a Jewish couple who were forced to give it to the German government in exchange for an exit visa to the United Kingdom shortly after Kristallnacht in 1939. By 2015, their descendants had filed a lawsuit against the museum, on the grounds that it was stolen by the Nazis.

Personal life
He first married at Castagnola-Cassarate, 1 August 1946, Austrian Princess Teresa Amalia Franziska Elisabeth Maria of Lippe-Weissenfeld (21 July 1925 – 16 July 2008), daughter of Prince Alfred of Lippe-Weissenfeld (1896-1970) and Countess Franziska of Schönborn-Buchheim (1902-1987). She belonged to the cadet branch of House of Lippe who had been reigning princes until the fall of the German Empire in 1918 (following their divorce on 14 May 1954, she married secondly in 1960 Prince Friedrich Maximilian zu Fürstenberg (1926–1969), by whom she had further issue). Their only son was: 
 Baron Georg Heinrich Thyssen-Bornemisza de Kászon (b. Lugano-Castagnola, 19 March 1950 - d. Zürich, 30 September 2022), chairman of TBG (Thyssen-Bornemisza Group) Holdings N.V., who has one son (born out of wedlock) by Countess Catharina Eleonore von Meran, former wife of Alexander Kahane and daughter of Count Maximilian von Meran (born 1930) and his wife, Princess Colienne zu Schwarzenberg (born 1937):
 Simon Thyssen-Bornemisza de Kászon (b. Wien, 1 December 2001)

Second marriage

His second marriage was in Colombo, Ceylon, or Paris, 23 June 1954, Anglo-Indian fashion model Nina Sheila Dyer (1930–1965), an heiress to properties in Ceylon; they had no children and divorced on 4 July 1956, pursuant to the settlement of which she received a château in France. She later married and divorced Prince Sadruddin Aga Khan and committed suicide in 1965.

Third marriage
He married for the third time at Lugano-Castagnola on 17 September 1956 New Zealand-born British photographic and fashion model Fiona Frances Elaine Campbell-Walter (b. Takapuna, New Zealand, 25 June 1932). They divorced on 20 January 1965, and she went on to have a well-publicized relationship with Greek shipping heir Alexander Onassis, the only son of Aristotle Onassis. She was a daughter of Rear Admiral Keith McNeil Walter (later Campbell-Walter) (1904–1976), aide de camp of King George VI and his wife, Frances Henriette Campbell (born in 1904), a maternal granddaughter of Sir Edward Campbell, 1st Baronet. Their children were: 
 Baroness Francesca Thyssen-Bornemisza (born Lausanne, 7 June 1958), married at Mariazell, 31 January 1993 to Karl Habsburg-Lothringen (divorced in 2017), heir to the defunct Austro-Hungarian imperial throne, and had issue.
 Baron Lorne Thyssen-Bornemisza de Kászon (born 15 June 1963), who converted to Islam; he is the producer and director of the 2003 film, "Labyrinth" and executive produced "The Garden of Eden" in 2008. He is the Chairman of Thyssen Petroleum and founder of the Kallos Gallery in London. He married in 2005 Alexandra Wright; they have one daughter.

Fourth marriage
He married for the fourth time at Lugano-Castagnola, 13 December 1967, Lilian Denise Shorto (b. Recife, 23 December 1942), a Brazilian banker's daughter, from whom he was divorced 29 November 1984. They had one son: 
 Baron Wilfrid "Alexander" August Thyssen-Bornemisza de Kászon (born Zurich 1974), unmarried and without issue.

Fifth marriage
His fifth and final marriage was in Daylesford, Gloucestershire, on 16 August 1985, María del Carmen Rosario Soledad Cervera y Fernández de la Guerra, popularly known as Carmen "Tita" Cervera, (born Sitges, Barcelona, 23 April 1943), who was Miss Spain in 1961. They had no children, but Hans Heinrich adopted her son, Alejandro Borja (born Madrid, 1980, son of Manuel Segura), who married at Barcelona, 11 October 2007 Blanca María Cuesta Unkhoff and had two children: Sacha Thyssen-Bornemisza de Kászon on 31 January 2008 and Eric Thyssen-Bornemisza de Kászon on 5 August 2010. His widow has also adopted two baby girls, twins, called Guadalupe Sabina and María del Carmen in July 2006.

Death
Hans Henrich died in Sant Feliu de Guíxols, Spain. He is buried in the family burial vault of Schloss Landsberg in the Ruhr valley near Essen, Germany.

Ancestry

See also
 Thyssen family
 Thyssen-Bornemisza Museum - museum link
 Exame - Negócios em Revista, April, 1989, Ano 1, N.º 1

Notes

External links
 
 Profile by Taki for The Spectator, 4 May 2002
 Ancestors of Baroness Francesca Anne Thyssen-Bornemisza de Kaszon
 Ancestors of Archduchess Eleonore of Austria
 Ancestors of Archduke Ferdinand of Austria
 Ancestors of Archduchess Gloria of Austria
 

1921 births
2002 deaths
Art collectors from The Hague
Dutch people of American descent
Barons of Hungary
Swiss art collectors
Hans Heinrich Thyssen-Bornemisza
Commanders of the Order of Isabella the Catholic
Museum founders
Dutch emigrants to Switzerland